The first season of the medical drama series The Night Shift aired between May 27, 2014 and July 15, 2014, on NBC in the United States. It was produced by Sachs/Judah Productions, and Sony Pictures Television with series creators Gabe Sachs and Jeff Judah serving as executive producers.

The series follows the overnight shift at San Antonio Medical Center, where three of the surgeons have a connection to the U.S. military. Dr. TC Callahan (Eoin Macken) is an ex-Army medic who initially exhibits PTSD-type symptoms, having watched his brother die right in front of him on the battlefield. He tends to go his own way at the hospital, frequently breaking rules and butting heads with his ex-girlfriend and newly appointed head of the night shift, Dr. Jordan Alexander (Jill Flint), and the hospital's administrator, Michael Ragosa (Freddy Rodriguez). 

On October 8, 2012, NBC placed a pilot order, under the name After Hours, and ordered four additional scripts on April 18, 2013 under the final name The Night Shift. It was renewed for a second season on July 1, 2014, after airing only 5 episodes.

The first episode premiered to 7.67 million viewers, winning its timeslot. It garnered a 1.6/5 adults 18-49 rating, second only to America's Got Talent for the whole day.

Production
The series first appeared as part of NBC development slate in October 2011, however, decided to not go forward with a pilot order. In August 2012, NBC decided to revisit the pilot script for the series, then known as The Last Stand. On October 8, 2012, NBC placed a pilot order, with the new name After Hours. The pilot was directed by Pierre Morel and written by Gabe Sachs and Jeff Judah.

On April 18, 2013, NBC ordered four additional scripts under a third and final title, The Night Shift. On May 10, 2013, NBC officially ordered The Night Shift to series. Production on season one of The Night Shift began in Albuquerque, New Mexico, in late August 2013, and ended filming in mid-November.

Casting
Casting announcements began in October 2012, with Eoin Macken first cast in the role of TC Callahan, a doctor who has recently returned from the Army, who constantly disagrees with his superiors and does things his own way. Freddy Rodriguez was the next actor cast in the series, in the role of Michael Ragosa, the hospital's administrator who originally wanted to be a doctor. Ken Leung and Jeananne Goossen were then added to the cast, with Leung cast in the role of Topher, an emergency room doctor who previously helped soldiers that were injured in battle. Goossen signed onto the role of Krista, a beautiful resident at the hospital. In early November, Robert Bailey Jr. joined the series as Paul Cummings, a young, but squeamish resident at the hospital. Jill Flint later signed onto the role of Jordan Alexander, the newly promoted Chief of the Night Shift, who once dated T.C. Daniella Alonso was the last actor cast in the series. Alonso will play the role of Dr. Landry de la Cruz, the lone psychiatrist working the night shift.

Cast

Main cast
 Eoin Macken as Dr. TC Callahan
 Jill Flint as Dr. Jordan Alexander
 Ken Leung as Dr. Topher Zia
 Brendan Fehr as Dr. Drew Alister
 Daniella Alonso as Dr. Landry de la Cruz
 Robert Bailey Jr. as Dr. Paul Cummings
 Jeananne Goossen as Dr. Krista Bell-Hart
 J.R. Lemon as ER Nurse Kenny Fournette
 Freddy Rodriguez as Dr. Michael Ragosa

Recurring cast
 Esodie Geiger as Nurse Molly Ramos 
 Alma Sisnero as Nurse Diaz 
 Catharine Pilafas as Nurse Bardocz 
 Luke MacFarlane as Rick Lincoln 
 Scott Wolf as Dr. Scott Clemmens

Episodes

Broadcast
The Night Shift airs on Global TV in Canada, and garnered 985,000 viewers for its debut on May 27, 2014. It began airing in Australia on May 29, 2014 on Universal Channel.

References

2014 American television seasons